The men's 1500 metres event at the 2009 Asian Athletics Championships was held at the Guangdong Olympic Stadium on November 10–11.

Medalists

Results

Heats

Final

References
Results

2009 Asian Athletics Championships
1500 metres at the Asian Athletics Championships